Fist & Faith (Chinese: 青禾男高) is a Chinese coming-of-age film directed by Jiang Zhuoyuan, starring Jing Tian and Oho Ou. It was released in China on July 13, 2017.

Synopsis
Set during the 1930s after the Japanese invasion of Manchuria, a teacher and a group of students establish a study club to preserve their language and culture as an act of protest against the foreign invaders. Jing Hao, a gang leader who fell in love with his teacher, Miss Liu Hei (Jing Tian), was building a reading society. Jing Hao needs to choose between his gang or his loved ones

Cast 
Jing Tian
Oho Ou
Meisa Kuroki
Kento Hayashi
Zhang Ningjiang
Chou You
Ding Guansen
Yin Fang
Xia En
Jiang Zongyuan
Hiroki Nakajima

References 

Chinese coming-of-age films
2017 films
Films set in the 1930s
Chinese teen films
Second Sino-Japanese War films
2010s coming-of-age films
2010s teen films
2010s Mandarin-language films